McNichols Sports Arena was an indoor arena located in Denver, Colorado. Located adjacent to Mile High Stadium and completed in 1975, at a cost of $16 million, it seated 16,061 for hockey games and 17,171 for basketball games.

Sports use
It was named after Denver mayor William H. McNichols Jr., who served from 1968 to 1983. A small-scale scandal surrounded the naming because McNichols was in office at the time.  

27 luxury suites were installed as part of a 1986 renovation. The renovation also saw the original Stewart-Warner end-zone scoreboards, which each had color matrix screens, upgraded by White Way Sign with new digits and to include new color video screens. 

McNichols Sports Arena was the home of the Denver Nuggets of the ABA and NBA for its entire existence from 1975 to 1999 It also hosted multiple hockey teams, including the Denver Spurs of the WHA during the 1975–76 season, the Colorado Rockies of the NHL from 1976 to 1982, the Colorado Flames of the CHL from 1982 to 1984, the Denver Grizzlies of the International Hockey League from 1994 to 1995, and the Colorado Avalanche of the NHL from 1995 to 1999.

The Colorado Avalanche played their final game on June 1, 1999, during the playoffs versus the Dallas Stars and the NBA's Denver Nuggets played their last game on May 5, 1999, against the Houston Rockets. Though the arena was only 24 years old when it was demolished, like most arenas of the 1970s, it was narrow and dark in the concourse level corridors. In addition, the locker rooms and shower facilities were not updated to NBA and NHL standards. Also, the arena lacked enough luxury suites (27 compared to some newer arenas' 200 or more) and had no club seating. Combined, these factors effectively made McNichols Sports Arena obsolete.

The arena closed after the Nuggets and Avalanche moved to the Pepsi Center and was demolished in 2000 to make space for a parking lot surrounding Empower Field at Mile High.

Notable events
McNichols hosted the NCAA Final Four in 1990, won by UNLV over Duke University and the West Regional semifinal in 1996. It was also host to the 1976 ABA All-Star Game, in which the host Nuggets defeated the ABA All-Stars, games 1, 2, and 5 of the 1976 ABA finals, and the 1984 NBA All-Star Game. It also hosted games one and two of the Stanley Cup Finals in 1996, where the Colorado Avalanche defeated the Florida Panthers in four games to bring Denver its first major sports championship.

UFC 1, the first event of the Ultimate Fighting Championship, was held there in 1993.

Another notable event at McNichols took place on December 13, 1983, when the Nuggets hosted the Detroit Pistons in a regular season contest. Nugget players Kiki Vandeweghe and Alex English scored 51 and 47 points respectively, while Piston Isiah Thomas also scored 47 points, with teammate John Long scoring 41 in a 186-184 triple-overtime Detroit win over the Nuggets. The game, still to date, is the highest-scoring game in NBA history, and also holds the record for the most players to score 40 or more points in a single game. However, the game was not televised in the Denver area (instead being shown back to the Detroit market, via WKBD-TV) and was attended by just over 9,300 people. This game has since been broadcast on NBA TV and ESPN Classic.

Concerts

The opening event at McNichols Sports Arena was a concert by Lawrence Welk on August 22, 1975.

The group Heart performed their rendition of "Unchained Melody" at the arena in 1980.  "Unchained Melody" was included on their highly successful double LP Greatest Hits/Live released November 1980.

The Grateful Dead made a stop here on their Fall Southwest Tour on October 9, 1977.

Elvis Presley performed a sold-out concert here on April 23, 1976.

Elton John performed here for two consecutive nights, October 5 and October 6, 1975 as part of the "West of the Rockies" tour.

Paul McCartney and Wings performed here for one night June 7, 1976

The Bee Gees played here on July 2, 1979, as part of their highly successful Spirits Having Flown Tour.

The band KISS performed at McNichols on November 4, 1979, as part of their Dynasty Tour. This was the last tour featuring original drummer Peter Criss until 1996.

Rolling Stones guitarists Keith Richards and Ron Wood performed as The New Barbarians at the arena in 1979.

REO Speedwagon's concert from 1981 was performed here, as MTV's first ever live concert.

Electric Light Orchestra performed here September 27, 1981 during the Time Tour.

The arena played host to Amnesty International's A Conspiracy of Hope Benefit Concert on June 8, 1986. The show was headlined by U2 and Sting and also featured Bryan Adams, Peter Gabriel, Lou Reed, Joan Baez and The Neville Brothers.

Parts of U2's half-live rockumentary Rattle and Hum, came from two concerts filmed in the arena on the third leg of the band's Joshua Tree Tour in November 1987. The recordings notably included Bono's famous "Fuck the revolution!" speech during "Sunday Bloody Sunday", featured in the accompanying film.

Jethro Tull played the arena from 1976 to 1980.

Def Leppard recorded one of their shows here in February 1988 and released it as Live: In the Round, in Your Face.

Pop star Michael Jackson performed 3 consecutive sold-out shows in front of 40,251 people during his Bad World Tour on March 24 and 25, & 26, 1988.

Pop star Prince made a stop here on July 3, 1986, while on his Parade Tour.

The bonus tracks on Stevie Ray Vaughan & Double Trouble's album In Step, including "The House is Rockin’" (Live), "Let Me Love You Baby" (Live), "Texas Flood" (Live), and "Life Without You" (Live) were recorded on November 29, 1989, at McNichols Sports Arena.

Depeche Mode held a concert for its Devotional Tour at the arena on November 2, 1993. Following the performance, keyboardist Martin Gore was arrested by local police and fined $50 for disturbing the peace when holding a loud party in his hotel room.

The very first Ultimate Fighting Championship (UFC) event UFC 1 was held on November 12, 1993.

Phish performed and recorded their show, on November 17, 1997, which was later released as a live album, entitled Live Phish Volume 11.

ZZ Top performed at the venue's final concert on September 12, 1999.  They were also the first rock band to play the arena on August 27, 1975.

Steve Miller Band and Bachman-Turner Overdrive played McNichols in 1978.

Rush played McNichols a few times, one occasion being March 1, 1980.

References

 

American Basketball Association venues
Colorado Rockies (NHL)
Denver Nuggets venues
Sports venues in Denver
Defunct National Hockey League venues
Defunct indoor arenas in the United States
World Hockey Association venues
Demolished sports venues in Colorado
Demolished music venues in the United States
Indoor ice hockey venues in Colorado
Defunct indoor soccer venues in the United States
Former National Basketball Association venues
1975 establishments in Colorado
Sports venues completed in 1975
1999 disestablishments in Colorado
Sports venues demolished in 2000
NCAA Division I men's basketball tournament Final Four venues
Colorado Avalanche